Give It All Away may refer to:

 Give It All Away (Ben Jelen album), 2004
 Give It All Away (Theo Tams album), 2009

See also
"Gave It All Away", a 2010 song by Irish band Boyzone
"Giving It All Away", a 1973 song by Roger Daltrey 
Give It Away (disambiguation)
Give It All (disambiguation)